The New National Party (abbr. NNP) was a Dutch nationalist political party which existed between 1998 and 2005. It succeeded the "Volksnationalisten Nederland" (abbr. VNN, People's Nationalists Netherlands) party which had been founded in 1997. The NNP was originally named "Nationale Partij Nederland" (National Party Netherlands) but because another party had used a similar name earlier the name was rejected by the Electoral Council (Dutch: Kiesraad).

The party was first led by Egbert Perée, then by Henk Ruitenberg (ex-CP'86) and after him Florens van der Kooi. The party was considered to be successor of the Centre Party '86 (CP'86), which was banned by a Dutch court in 1998 as a "criminal organization".

The NNP was never charged or convicted under the criminal code. The party was dissolved in 2005 after many members left the party for newer parties, such as the conservative rightist New Right party and the largely national socialist National Alliance party.

The NNP worked with New Right in the Actiecomité Stop MARTIJN which campaigned against the pedophiles of the Vereniging Martijn in 2003.

Several former NNP members later became active for Voorpost, including Van der Kooi.

External links 
 Archive of the former website of the NNP on the Wayback Machine

Defunct nationalist parties in the Netherlands
Far-right politics in the Netherlands
Political parties established in 1998
Political parties disestablished in 2005